Shulgino is a rural locality (a village) in Gamovskoye Rural Settlement, Permsky District, Perm Krai, Russia. The population was 35 as of 2010.

Geography 
Shulgino is located 23 km southwest of Perm (the district's administrative centre) by road. Savenki is the nearest rural locality.

References 

Rural localities in Permsky District